Cooling-off period may refer to:
30-day cooling off period, a mediation or conciliation period required by law or contract before strike or lockout can go into effect
Cooling-off period (consumer rights), a period of time during which the purchaser may cancel a purchase
Quiet period, the time which a company making an IPO must be silent about it, so as not to inflate the value of the stock artificially
Standstill period, the time to allow unsuccessful bidders to challenge the decision before a contract is signed
Waiting period, in the U.S., a required time between buying a firearm and obtaining it
in anger management, a period of time where parties in disagreement do not communicate with each other
a period of time after the termination of a worker's employment in which they are prohibited from obtaining employment with competing entities, see non-compete clause
in the nuclear power industry, the length of time that spent nuclear fuel must be stored in water before enough heat is dissipated so that the waste product can be safely reprocessed or transported
the defining difference between a spree killer and a serial killer